Doug Peacock may refer to:
 Doug Peacock, American outdoorsman
 Doug Peacock (Canadian politician), Canadian politician
Douglas Peacock, co-founder of TransDigm Group